Akoldah Gak (born 12 July 2002) is an Australian professional basketball player who last played for the Illawarra Hawks of the National Basketball League (NBL).

High school career
Gak attended St Dominic's College in Sydney, New South Wales. Gak received a scholarship to attend Blair Academy in the United States in 2018 through a basketball pipeline that was established by professional basketball player and Blair alumni, Luol Deng.

Professional career
On 12 October 2020, Gak signed a three-year deal with the Illawarra Hawks of the National Basketball League (NBL). He was rostered as a development player during the 2020–21 NBL season before he became a contracted player for the remainder of his tenure. Gak's family chose for him to develop in Australia due to the global uncertainty from the COVID-19 pandemic; Hawks head coach Brian Goorjian considered the assignment of a National Basketball Association (NBA) prospect to his team as a "real compliment".

Gak played for the Chicago Bulls at the 2022 NBA Summer League.

National team career
Gak played for the Australia men's national under-19 basketball team at the 2021 FIBA Under-19 Basketball World Cup.

Personal life
Gak was born in Sydney, New South Wales, in 2002 to parents who had fled South Sudan and moved to Australia. Two of his older brothers have played college basketball: Gorjok for the California Baptist Lancers and Deng for the Miami Hurricanes.

References

External links
NBL profile

2002 births
Living people
Australian expatriate basketball people in the United States
Australian men's basketball players
Australian people of South Sudanese descent
Sportspeople of South Sudanese descent
Basketball players from Sydney
Blair Academy alumni
Forwards (basketball)
Illawarra Hawks players